In boxing, a straight or cross (also commonly called or a rear hand punch) are punches usually thrown with the dominant hand 
and are power punches like the uppercut and hook. Compubox, a computerized punch scoring system, counts the straight and cross as power punches.

The Straight/Cross remains one of the most common methods of knockout across combat sports including boxing, kickboxing, and MMA.

Technique
From the guard position, the rear hand is thrown from the chin, travelling towards the target in a straight line. The rear shoulder is comes forward and finishes touching the outside of the chin. For cover, the lead hand can be retracted and tucked against the face to protect the inside of the chin. For additional power, the torso and hips rotate counterclockwise (for right-hand dominant, and clockwise for left-hand dominant) as the straight/cross is thrown. Weight is also transferred from the rear foot to the lead foot, resulting in the rear heel turning outwards to transfer weight. Body rotation and the sudden weight transfer is what gives the straight/cross its power. 

If it is thrown the instant an opponent leads with the same side hand. The blow crosses over the leading arm, hence its name. If the rear hand instead travels inside the opponent's guard, it is a straight. 

It is commonly used to set up a hook. The straight/cross can also follow a jab, creating the classic "one-two combo".

References

External links 

Boxing terminology
Kickboxing terminology
Punches (combat)